Majority vote required to win, necessitating a run-off election in the 1st (Western) district.

Notes

See also 
 United States House of Representatives elections, 1798 and 1799
 List of United States representatives from Vermont

1798
Vermont
United States House of Representatives